Cerithiopsis arnoldi is a species of very small sea snails, marine gastropod molluscs in the family Cerithiopsidae. It was described by Bartsch in 1911.

References

arnoldi
Gastropods described in 1911